Carpocrates of Alexandria was the founder of an early Gnostic sect from the first half of the 2nd century. As with many Gnostic sects, one knows of the Carpocratians only through the writings of the Church Fathers, principally Irenaeus of Lyons and Clement of Alexandria. As these writers strongly opposed Gnostic doctrine, there is a question of negative bias when using this source. While the various references to the Carpocratians differ in some details, they agree as to the libertinism of the sect, a charge commonly levied by pagans against Christians and conversely by Christians against pagans and heretics.

Irenaeus
The earliest and most vivid account of Carpocrates and his followers comes from Irenaeus (died 202) in his Against Heresies including an account of the theology and practice of the sect.

They believe, he writes, that Jesus was not divine; but because his soul was "steadfast and pure", he "remembered those things which he had witnessed within the sphere of the unbegotten God" (similar to Plato's concept of Anamnesis). Because of this, Jesus was able to free himself from the material powers (what other Gnostics call Archons, the Demiurge, etc.). Carpocratians believed they themselves could transcend the material realm, and therefore were no longer bound by Mosaic law, which was based on the material powers, or by any other morality, which, they held, was mere human opinion. Irenaeus offers this belief as an explanation of their licentious behaviour.

Irenaeus then goes on to provide his further, slightly different, explanation. The followers of Carpocrates, he says, believed that in order to leave this world, one's imprisoned eternal soul must pass through every possible condition of earthly life. Moreover, it is possible to do this within one lifetime. As a result, the Carpocratians did "all those things which we dare not either speak or hear of" so that when they died, they would not be compelled to incarnate again but would return to God. (Borges depicts a fictional sect with this belief in his short story "The Theologians".)

Irenaeus says that they practised various magical arts as well as leading a licentious life. He also says that they possessed a portrait of Christ, a painting they claimed had been made by Pontius Pilate during his lifetime, which they honoured along with images of Plato, Pythagoras and Aristotle "in the manner of the Gentiles".

Some early Christian authors opposed representational art, and statues and portraits and sculptures are crude and stylised. According to Robin Lane Fox: "Only one group of early Christians, the heretical Carpocratians, are known to have owned portraits of Christ". However, early Christian art from the early third century depicting Jesus is widespread and cannot be limited only to the Carpocratians. Furthermore, the fact that depictions of Jesus are mentioned by multiple early Christian authors, whether in a positive or negative manner, is an indication that these depictions were popular enough to be noticed and must have received the acceptance of some Christian authorities. Moreover, Christianity is rooted in Judaism, which generally forbids religious depictions, and the reluctance of some authors to accept depictions of Jesus could be ascribed to the Jewish roots of Christianity rather than to any non-Jewish Christian doctrine.

Clement
Carpocrates is also mentioned by Clement of Alexandria in his Stromateis. Clement quotes extensively from On Righteousness which he says was written by Epiphanes, Carpocrates' son. No copy outside of Clement's citation exists, but the writing is of a strongly antinomian bent. It claims that differences in class and the ownership of property are unnatural, and argues for property and women to be held in common. Clement insists on the alleged licentiousness of the Carpocratians, claiming that at their Agape (meaning an early Christian gathering) they "have intercourse where they will and with whom they will".

According to Clement, Carpocrates was from Alexandria although his sect was primarily located in Cephallenia.

Carpocrates is again mentioned in the controversial Mar Saba letter (also called To Theodore), purportedly also by Clement of Alexandria, which was discovered by Morton Smith while cataloging books at the Monastery of Mar Saba in 1958. This document was examined by several other scholars in the preceding decades, including Quentin Quesnell. The letter details how Carpocrates obtained the copy of Secret Gospel of Mark:But since the foul demons are always devising destruction for the race of men, Carpocrates, instructed by them and using deceitful arts, so enslaved a certain presbyter of the church in Alexandria that he got from him a copy of the secret Gospel, which he both interpreted according to his blasphemous and carnal doctrine and, moreover, polluted, mixing with the spotless and holy words utterly shameless lies. From this mixture is drawn off the teaching of the Carpocratians.  The letter mentions and quotes from the previously unknown Secret Mark, focusing on the episode where Jesus brings a youth back from the dead. The letter's writer (perhaps Clement) tells Theodore that the secret version of Mark does not contain references to "the many other [things about] which you wrote" including the specific phrase "naked with naked."

Miscellaneous references
Other references to Carpocrates exist but are likely to be based on the two already cited.

Epiphanius of Salamis writes that

Carpocrates is also mentioned by Tertullian and Hippolytus, both of whom seem to rely on Irenaeus; and also perhaps by Origen and Hegesippus.

Søren Kierkegaard mentioned them in his 1844 book, The Concept of Anxiety:

See also
 Borborites
 Cainites
 Ebionites
 Epiphanes (gnostic)
 Fathers of Christian Gnosticism
 Gnosticism
Marcellina (Gnostic)
 Neoplatonism and Gnosticism
 Salome (disciple)

References

External links
Irenaeus, Against Heresies Book i.xxv
Clement, Stromateis Book iii.ii
Carpocrates and the Carpocratians (New Schaff-Herzog Encyclopedia)

2nd-century Christian theologians
Gnostics